Hellvik is a village in the municipality of Nesodden, Norway. It is situated on the eastern coast of Nesodden with a coastal view of Bunnefjorden. Hellvik lies north of Berger, east of Skoklefall and south of Ursvik. As Nesodden is a peninsula, the estimated time on the road, when heading into Oslo sentrum is about 50 minutes.

Hellviktangen, a bit north of Hellvikstrand, is an old farm, turned into a café, now surrounded by green fields and beaches – the café and the area surrounding it has many times been nominated to be one of the "pearls" of eastern Norway. The village is connected by Hellvikskogveien, Hellvikveien and Hellvikstrand.

References

Villages in Akershus